Mark Komp (born 21 March 1959) is  a former Australian rules footballer who played with Footscray in the Victorian Football League (VFL).

Notes

External links 		
		
		
		
		
		
		
Living people		
1959 births		
Australian rules footballers from Victoria (Australia)		
Western Bulldogs players
People educated at Geelong College